Richard Caruthers Little  (born November 26, 1938) is a Canadian-American impressionist and voice actor. Sometimes known as the "Man of a Thousand Voices", Little has recorded nine comedy albums and made numerous television appearances, including three HBO specials.

Early life
Little was born in Ottawa, Ontario, Canada, the middle of three sons. His father, Lawrence Peniston Little, was a surgeon who served as a lieutenant commander in the Royal Canadian Naval Volunteer Reserve during World War II and then worked for the Department of Veterans’ Affairs until his death in 1959. His mother, Elizabeth Maud (née Wilson), was a housewife. A third-generation Canadian, he is descended from English stock on his father's side and Irish on his mother's. On his mother's side, he is descended from John Willson, who was Speaker of the 5th Parliament of Upper Canada in the 1820s. His paternal great-grandfather, William Carruthers Little, was a Liberal-Conservative Member of Parliament in the Canadian House of Commons from 1867 to 1881.

He attended Lisgar Collegiate Institute. In his early teens, he formed a partnership with Geoff Scott, another budding impressionist (and future elected politician), concentrating on reproducing the voices of Canadian politicians such as Prime Minister John Diefenbaker and Ottawa mayor Charlotte Whitton.

Career

Early career in Ottawa
Starting when he was 11, Little acted in two documentary movies for Crawley Films of Ottawa.

Little was an usher at the Elgin Movie Theatre in Ottawa, where he perfected his voices while standing at the back of the theatre. He started his amateur acting career at the Ottawa Little Theatre, winning his first acting award at the Eastern Ontario Drama Festival in Deep River, Ontario. At 17, his friend and fellow impressionist Geoff Scott and he  won a talent contest on CBOT in Ottawa, the first time he was paid for his impressionist skills, which led to an appearance on Pick the Stars, a national talent contest broadcast by CBC Television in 1956. They then appeared on The Jackie Rae Show during the 1956–57 season.

Little and Scott's comedy team performed at various local events and venues. Still in their teens, they developed a 10-minute act that they performed at Shriners’ conventions and Knights of Columbus meetings. Scott later entered journalism, and ultimately politics.

Little became a relief announcer on Ottawa radio station CFRA and performed comedy sketches with Les Lye on Lye's morning show, before being hired as a disc jockey on CJET in Smiths Falls, Ontario. His afternoon-evening shift ran from 4 to 8 pm weekdays, and the show gave him the opportunity to use his impressions on the air. By the 1960s, Little was taking his act to Toronto, where he performed at coffee houses and other venues.

In 1963, Little issued two LPs through the Canadian division of Capitol Records: My Fellow Canadians with Les Lye. The album was inspired by Vaughn Meader's hit American satirical album The First Family and concentrated on Canadian political satire, featuring Little impersonating figures well-known to a Canadian audience such as Diefenbaker, Lester Pearson and Tommy Douglas, and Scrooge and the Stars, which featured Little acting out Charles Dickens' A Christmas Carol entirely on his own, playing all the roles as 22 different Hollywood stars, ranging from Jack Benny to Jack Webb. The album was released in early November, but it had to be withdrawn a few weeks later due to the assassination of John F. Kennedy, as Little had imitated JFK in the role of the Spirit of Christmas Present and had Kennedy say the line “Scrooge, my life upon the globe is brief; it ends tonight. In fact, it ends as fast as you can say your name.”

Breaking into the US
Little's first performance in the US was in December 1963 at Guy Lombardo’s inn and country club in Tierra Verde, Florida.

Little's American career was helped by Peppiatt and Aylesworth, a Canadian writing team who had moved to Hollywood and worked on various specials and variety series, including  The Judy Garland Show. Familiar with Little's work in Canada, Peppiatt had worked on The Jackie Rae Show on which Little made a television appearance at 17, and the team had written for Little's Canadian nightclub act. They played a recording of Little for Garland, and the show's musical director, Mel Tormé, and they encouraged her to audition him. Tormé had met Little when they both performed in a CBC Television variety show in Toronto, and bonded over their love of old movies.

The audition won him the job, and in January 1964, Little made his American television debut on CBS's The Judy Garland Show, where he impressed Garland by imitating various male celebrities, including James Mason, who had been Garland's co-star in A Star Is Born. Television appearances on variety shows hosted by Ed Sullivan, Jackie Gleason, Rudy Vallee, Mike Douglas, George Burns, and Al Hirt followed over the next two years.

Peppiatt and Aylesworth also helped bring Little on to other American shows for which they wrote, such as The Jimmy Dean Show, The Kopykats, and The Julie Andrews Hour and continued to write material for his act after he moved to the US permanently at the end of 1965.

In Canada, Little starred in his own show The Rich Little Show, on CBC Radio in 1966.  He also made his first appearances on The Dean Martin Show and The Jimmy Dean Show during the 1965–1966 season.

In 1965, Little provided the voice for the Pink Panther in two cartoons, Sink Pink and Pink Ice; these two cartoons were made by DePatie-Freleng Enterprises to experiment with giving the Panther dialogue, contrary to him usually being mute.

In 1966 and 1967, Little appeared in ABC-TV's Judy Carne sitcom Love on a Rooftop as the Willises' eccentric neighbour, Stan Parker. He appeared on That Girl in 1967 as a writer who impressed Marlo Thomas' character with his impersonations. He also made two memorable appearances as accident-prone Brother Paul Leonardi on The Flying Nun in 1968; it marked one of his few appearances as a character actor rather than an impressionist.  In 1969, he appeared in an episode of Petticoat Junction as newly engaged fiancé to Billie Jo in "Billie Jo and the Big Big Star".

Nixon
Little was most notable for impressions of U.S. President Richard Nixon. During the 1970s, Little made many television appearances portraying Nixon, and once performed his impersonation in front of Nixon himself, who Little says did not realize he was imitating him at all and "wondered why I was talking to him in such a funny voice." In 1972, he portrayed Richard Nixon with the voice and mannerisms of Oliver Hardy in Another Nice Mess. Little later appeared as Nixon on the soap opera Santa Barbara, in a 1991 fantasy sequence regarding Gina's ideal sperm donor.

In 2020, Little developed Trial on the Potomac: The Impeachment of Richard Nixon, a one-man show based on the 2015 book The Real Watergate Scandal: Collusion, Conspiracy, and the Plot That Brought Nixon Down by Geoff Shepard, alleging a conspiracy to remove Nixon from office.

1970s
Little was also a semiregular on the Emmy-winning ABC-TV variety series The Julie Andrews Hour in 1972–73. In response to his imitation of Jack Benny, the comedian sent Little an 18-carat gold money clip containing this message: "With Bob Hope doing my walk and you doing my voice, I can be a star and do nothing." He was named "Comedy Star of the Year" by the American Guild of Variety Artists in 1974.

Little's best-known continuing TV series was The Kopycats, hour-long segments of The ABC Comedy Hour,  broadcast in 1972. Taped in England, these comedy-variety shows consisted entirely of celebrity impersonations, with the actors in full costume and makeup for every sketch. The cast included Little, Frank Gorshin, Marilyn Michaels, George Kirby, British comedian Joe Baker, Fred Travalena, Charlie Callas, and Peter Goodwright.

Little was a regular guest on The Dean Martin Celebrity Roasts in the 1970s, appearing in 24 of the specials, where he roasted celebrities such as Don Rickles, Jack Benny, Johnny Carson, Frank Sinatra, Jimmy Stewart and Kirk Douglas.

The Rich Little Show (1976) on NBC and The New You Asked for It (1981) were attempts to present Little in his own person, away from his gallery of characterizations. Little also appeared on a second-season episode of The Muppet Show.

The 1978 one-man show Rich Little's Christmas Carol was his first HBO special, produced by and originally aired on CBC Television, Little portrayed famous comedians in established roles (W. C. Fields as Ebenezer Scrooge, Paul Lynde as Bob Cratchit, et al.).

1980s
In 1981, Little appeared in a comedy LP called The First Family Rides Again, which was the fourth and final of the First Family comedy LPs originally created by Bob Booker and Earle Doud. Little starred along with Melanie Chartoff, Michael Richards, Shelly Black, Jenilee Harrison, Earle Doud, and Vaughn Meader, making light of U.S. President Ronald Reagan's first few months in the White House.

Another HBO special followed in 1983 with Rich Little's Robin Hood, including portrayals of Groucho Marx as Robin Hood, Humphrey Bogart as Prince John, John Wayne as Little John, Carol Channing as Maid Marion, Laurel and Hardy as Sheriffs of Nottingham, George Burns as Alan-a-Dale, and various other characters.

Outside of any comedic context, Little's talent for impersonation has been used in movies when an actor's dialogue was impaired by poor health. When David Niven proved too ill for his voice to be used in his appearances in Trail of the Pink Panther (1982) and Curse of the Pink Panther (1983), Little provided the overdub as an imitation of Niven's voice. He performed similar duties to dub an imitation of James Cagney's stroke-impaired voice in the 1984 TV movie Terrible Joe Moran and in the 1991 TV special Christmas at the Movies by providing an uncredited dub for actor/dancer Gene Kelly, who had lost his voice.

He also lent his voice to the narration of three specials that were the forerunners for the animated series The Raccoons: The Christmas Raccoons, The Raccoons on Ice, and The Raccoons and the Lost Star.

In 1987, during the We the People 200: The Constitutional Gala television special, Little personified various historical figures, including Franklin D. Roosevelt, Edward R. Murrow, John F. Kennedy, Martin Luther King Jr., and Robert F. Kennedy. Little's performance was described as eclectic, impersonating Henry Fonda as Abraham Lincoln and doing Winston Churchill giving a rousing speech.

The Tonight Show
Little was a frequent guest on variety and talk shows in the 1960s and 1970s, and had an unofficial monthly slot on The Tonight Show Starring Johnny Carson for several years, and also guest hosted the program about a dozen times. He developed an impression of Johnny Carson, capturing The Tonight Show host's voice and many onstage mannerisms, and later played Carson in the HBO TV movie The Late Shift. Little's spot-on impersonation allegedly got under the thin skin of Carson, and he was permanently banned from appearing on the Tonight Show without notice or reason after his August 1982 appearance. Little claims in his biography that he was banned because Carson was offended by his impression, and this claim was supported by Henry Bushkin, Carson's long-time lawyer, who stated that nobody got under Carson's skin more than Little.  Little had been doing the impression since the early 1970s, though, a decade prior to his bookings on the show coming to an end, including performing the impression to the Tonight Show''' host's face when Carson was the guest of honor at The Dean Martin Celebrity Roast of Johnny Carson in 1973. In response to Little's claims, Fred DeCordova, Carson's producer, said they just were not interested in hiring him any more due to his lack of new impressions.

Las Vegas and later career
Little has been appearing in Las Vegas since the mid-1960s, when he had dates at the Golden Nugget and went on to play at other Vegas venues such as The Sands, where he debuted in 1969 with a two-year contract. In 1973, he performed at Caesars Palace for four weeks as the opening act for The Osmonds. He then appeared at the Desert Inn with Juliet Prowse for a month in 1974. His appearances continued throughout the 1970s and 1980s; he headlined at the Desert Inn for eight years in the late 1970s and 1980s, at the MGM Grand with Nell Carter in 1985; at Bally's, with Charo in 1986; the Sands in 1991 and 1992, and at the Golden Nugget again in 1991.

With opportunities for him to work in television and film in decline, and his television work almost completely drying up by the mid-1980s, the focus of Little's career shifted from Hollywood to Las Vegas. The decline in his career was blamed in part on him not having updated his repertory of impressions with younger voices, a fact he blames on recent generations of actors using a naturalistic delivery that makes their voices less distinctive. "It’s much easier to do Humphrey Bogart than Tom Cruise," he said. "How do you imitate Brad Pitt? George Clooney? Wouldn’t mean anything."

Little  sold his house in Los Angeles and relocated to Las Vegas in 1990, and bought a home in 1992, when he signed an exclusive, long-term contract with the Sahara, staging a revamped version of The Kopykats with other impersonators. He later moved to Paris Las Vegas, where he starred in The Presidents, a play on nine Presidents of the United States from Kennedy to George W. Bush, starting in 2002. In 2004, he moved to the Suncoast.

In the early 2010s, he performed a one-man show, Jimmy Stewart and Friends, based on the life of Jimmy Stewart, at the Westgate hotel, and on tour. After the death of his friend Jimmy Stewart in the late 1990s, Rich recorded the crosswalk messages for intersections in Stewart's hometown of Indiana, Pennsylvania, using his imitation of the star's voice.

Since 2015, Little has been a regular performer at the Laugh Factory in the Tropicana hotel in Las Vegas. His one-hour show, Rich Little Live!, is a career retrospective including video highlights from his TV career, and is performed five nights a week. Throughout the show, he displays many of the charcoal sketches he has drawn of the celebrities he has impersonated.

Little was the host for the 2007 White House Correspondents' Association dinner. Although President George W. Bush was reported to have enjoyed Little's performance, it was panned by some reviewers for "his ancient jokes and impressions of dead people (Johnny Carson, Richard Nixon, and Ronald Reagan)."

Little appeared as a guest star in Futurama: Bender's Game, playing his own celebrity head: "This is Rich Little, impersonating Howard Cosell." In 1998, Little was inducted into Canada's Walk of Fame, and was inducted into the Casino Legends Hall of Fame in 1999, and was given a star on the Las Vegas Walk of Stars in 2005.

In 2017, Little released his memoir, Little by Little: People I Have Known and Been.  In 2021, CBS News Sunday Morning profiled Little; during the interview, he stated he believed it was the first time he had been on network television in 30 years, and hoped it would "go over well!" 

In 2018, he appeared as himself in the documentary They'll Love Me When I'm Dead about Orson Welles' final film The Other Side of the Wind. Little was in the original 1974 cast but left for other commitments and his scenes were reshot using Peter Bogdanovich playing the part. Bogdanovich completed directing the film in 2018 after Welles died in 1985.  Little is credited as a party guest in The Other Side of the Wind.

Little was appointed to the Order of Canada in 2022, with the rank of Officer.

Little frequently appears on former Governor Mike Huckabee's cable show on the Trinity Broadcast Network. He has been a guest more than any other person, appearing as recently as January 2023.

Other interests
Little has been active in several charities, including the Juvenile Diabetes Fund and the Children's Miracle Network. He has been named to Miami Children's Hospital International Pediatrics Hall of Fame and been honoured by the naming of the Rich Little Special Care Nursery at Ottawa Civic Hospital. He has been a major supporter in helping veterans through the Gary Sinise Foundation.

Personal life
Little was engaged to Canadian actress Jean Christopher in 1965, but they did not end up marrying.

Little was married to Jeanne Worden, whom he met when she was working as a secretary on The Joey Bishop Show'', in 1971. The couple had a daughter together, Bria, before their divorce in 1989. Little had a brief relationship with Lalette Cottrell, of Delaware; the couple had a daughter together, Lyndsay (born 1988).

Little was engaged to magician Melinda Saxe, but she broke off the three-year relationship in 1991, saying she had discovered he had secretly videotaped them having sex in 1988. Saxe sued Little for defamation, invasion of privacy, and inflicting emotional distress, claiming he had joked about their relationship on stage. Little claimed the videotaping was consensual. The lawsuit was eventually settled out of court.

He married comedian and impressionist Jeannette Markey in 1994; they divorced in 1997. He was married to Marie Marotta from 2003 until her death in 2010 of a deliberate overdose of sleeping pills after years of suffering from migraines and chronic pain. He married his fourth wife, Catherine Brown, a former reality show contestant, in a private ceremony in 2012; they divorced in October of that year.

In 1998, a Golden Palm Star on the Palm Springs, California, Walk of Stars was dedicated to him.

In 2010, Little became a naturalized citizen of the United States.

References

External links

 
 
 

1938 births
Canadian expatriate male actors in the United States
Canadian impressionists (entertainers)
Canadian male film actors
Canadian male television actors
Canadian male voice actors
Canadian stand-up comedians
Whistlers
Capitol Records artists
Colgems Records artists
Juno Award for Comedy Album of the Year winners
Las Vegas shows
Animal impersonators
Lisgar Collegiate Institute alumni
Living people
Male actors from Ottawa
Male actors from Las Vegas
Mercury Records artists
Comedians from Ontario
Canadian Comedy Award winners
Officers of the Order of Canada